The Boston School (also called the Stravinsky School) was a group of composers, most of them Jewish, from Boston, Massachusetts who were influenced by the neoclassicism of  Igor Stravinsky:
 
Arthur Berger
Irving Fine
Lukas Foss
Alexei Haieff
Harold Shapero
Claudio Spies
Leonard Bernstein
Ingolf Dahl
John Lessard
Louise Talma
 
Many of them studied with Nadia Boulanger. Irving Fine described the music of Stravinsky and his followers as "diatonic and tonal or quasi-modal", pandiatonic, and concerned with chord spacing and rhythm.

See also
 The Second New England School, also known as the "Boston Six"

Sources

Composition schools
Culture of Boston
New England

Neoclassicism (music)
Organizations based in Boston
20th-century American composers